Melchior's Downer House (Danish: Melchiors Enkesæde), situated in a small public greenspace at the corner of Byvej and Engholmvej in Stenløse, Egedal Municipality, some 10 km northwest of central Copenhagen, Denmark, was built to provide housing for widows of rectors, parish clerks and school teachers. Built in 1802, it is the second oldest building in Stenløse (after Stenløse Church). It was listed in the Danish registry of protected
buildings and places in 1868.

History
Albert Melchior (1732-1805) assumed the position as parish clerk (Danish: Degn) for the parishes of Stenløse and Veksø in 1761. He moved into the parish clerk's house (Degneboligen) but since the old parish clerk who had fallen ill was still alive for the first few years also had to house and care for him and his wife.
 
Melchior bought the parish clerk's house in 1785. He and his wife had no children. but opened their home to those in need. At the time of the 1887 census, their household included the wife's nephew, an illegitimate child from the Poor Law Authority (Fattigvæsenet), two physically disabled women aged 21 and 26 and a 61-year-old woman dependent on charity (almisselem).

Melchior's house burned down after his wife had passed away and he was then afforded a home in the local rectory. Money from the fire insurance enabled him to rebuild the house. He was granted royal permission to build a charitable downer house for widows of rectors, parish clerks and school teachers, which was completed in 1802.

The house contained two dwellings and was administrated by the local rector. It sat on am approximately 2 hectares (4 tønder) piece of land but the land was gradually sold off to pay for its maintenance. In 1968, it was acquired by Stenløse Municipality and the same year listed in the Danish registry of protected buildings and places. It had by then housed a total of 15 widows.

Architecture
The building has a thatched roof with a large, gabled wall dormer over the main entrance and white-painted walls with timber framing.

Today
The building was renovated in 1998 and now contains a total of three apartments. The remaining land has been turned into a small public greenspace with a pond and large trees.

Further reading
 Stiesdal, Bent: Enkesædet i Stenløse, Stenløse Historiske Forening No. 34, 2001

References

Houses in Egedal Municipality
Listed buildings and structures in Egedal Municipality
Thatched buildings in Denmark
Houses completed in 1802
1802 establishments in Denmark